Rakesh Kumar may refer to:

 Rakesh Kumar (cricketer) (born 1992), Indian cricketer
 Rakesh Kumar (kabaddi) (born 1982), Indian kabaddi player
 Rakesh Kumar (politician) (born 1973), Indian politician
 Rakesh Ranjan Kumar (born 1972), Indian film director and writer